Caloecia is a genus of moths in the family Lasiocampidae. The genus was erected by William Barnes and James Halliday McDunnough in 1911. Both species are known from the US state of Arizona.

Species
Based on Lepidoptera and Some Other Life Forms:
Caloecia juvenalis (Barnes & McDunnough, 1911)
Caloecia entima Franclemont, 1973

External links

Lasiocampidae
Taxa named by William Barnes (entomologist)
Taxa named by James Halliday McDunnough